Lauren Nicholson (born 26 March 1993) is an Australian professional basketball player.

College
Nicholson played college basketball at Saint Mary's College of California in Moraga, California for the Saint Mary's Gaels.

Statistics 

|-
|2012–13
|Saint Mary's
|31
|0
|13.9
|31.6%
|28.6%
|76.7%
|1.6
|0.3
|0.1
|0.3
|0.6
|3.0
|-
|2013–14
|Saint Mary's
|18
|16
|29.7
|49.4%
|48.0%
|80.0%
|2.7
|1.3
|0.0
|0.7
|1.8
|12.4
|-
|2014–15
|Saint Mary's
|33
|33
|33.1
|47.0%
|33.6%
|81.7%
|3.5
|1.8
|0.2
|1.1
|3.2
|17.6
|-
|2015–16
|Saint Mary's
|28
|25
|31.6
|45.4%
|30.1%
|89.0%
|3.9
|2.1
|0.1
|0.6
|2.3
|17.0
|-
|Career
|
|110
|74
|26.7
|45.4%
|36.0%
|84.3%
|2.9
|1.4
|0.1
|0.7
|2.0
|12.5

Career

WNBL
Nicholson would begin her WNBL career in her home town, as a development player, with the Sydney Uni Flames. Nicholson remained a member of the Flames squad through to 2011. She then departed to begin her college career in the United States. After the conclusion of her college career, Nicholson returned to Australia and she was signed by the Sydney Uni Flames for 2016–17.

During her second season with the Adelaide Lightning, Nicholson was recognised as the WNBL Defensive Player of the Year for the 2018–19 season.

In 2020, Nicholson would head North and sign with the Townsville Fire for the 2020–21 WNBL season.

National Team

Youth Level
Nicholson first played for Australia at the 2009 FIBA Oceania Under-16 Championship for Women where she took home Gold in Brisbane, Australia. She would then go on to participate in the inaugural Under-17 world championship in France where Australia placed seventh.

Senior Level
In January 2019, Nicholson was named to her first Opals squad, earning her a place in the first camp as preparations for this years upcoming tournaments got underway. After taking part in the Opals team camps, Nicholson was named to the final roster for the 2019 FIBA Asia Cup where she would make her Opals debut.

References

1993 births
Living people
Australian expatriate basketball people in the United States
Australian women's basketball players
Forwards (basketball)
Saint Mary's Gaels women's basketball players
Basketball players from Sydney
Sydney Uni Flames players